Chah Zangi (also Romanized as Chāh Zangī) is a village in Qaleh Ganj Rural District, in the Central District of Qaleh Ganj County, Kerman Province, Iran. At the 2006 census, its population was 163, in 30 families.

References 

Populated places in Qaleh Ganj County